Statistics of Meistaradeildin in the 1969 season.

Overview
It was contested by 5 teams, and KÍ Klaksvík won the championship.

League table

Results

References
RSSSF

Meistaradeildin seasons
Faroe
Faroe